Samuel Sanders (27 June 19379 July 1999) was a distinguished American classical pianist known for sensitive collaborations with noted soloists.

He was born with a congenital heart condition that required him to undergo surgery at the age of nine. He studied at Hunter College and at the Juilliard School under Sergius Kagen and Irwin Freundlich. Sanders was famous for the loyalty of his collaborators.

Among the artist with whom he collaborated are Hermann Baumann (horn), Jacqueline DuPre (cello), Joshua Bell (violin). Kyung Wha Chung (violin), Jaime Laredo (violin), Yo-Yo Ma (cello), Jessye Norman (soprano), Rachel Barton Pine (violin), Paula Robison (flute), Leonard Rose (cello), Mstislav Rostropovich (cello), Robert White (tenor), Eugenia Zukerman (flute), and Pinchas Zukerman (violin).

In 1996 Sanders and violinist Itzhak Perlman marked the thirtieth anniversary of a partnership which took them to many parts of the world and resulted in twelve recordings, two of which were awarded Grammys.

With Chilean cellist Andres Diaz (cello) Sanders formed Diaz-Sanders Duo.

Sanders was the founder and artistic director of the Cape and Islands Chamber Music Festival in Cape Cod, Massachusetts.

He received honorary doctorates from Lehman College and the St. Louis Conservatory of Music (CASA), and taught for more than three decades at the Juilliard School, where he helped found a degree program for collaborative pianists.

Samuel Sanders died from liver failure at New York Presbyterian Hospital in 1999. He was 62 and lived in Manhattan.

References 

1937 births
1999 deaths
Classical accompanists
American classical pianists
Male classical pianists
American male pianists
20th-century classical pianists
20th-century American pianists
20th-century American male musicians